Marcos Pereira da Silva (born 4 August 1975), commonly known as Dude, is a Brazilian former professional footballer. He spent the majority of his career with Fortaleza, amassing more than 400 appearances.

Honours
Fortaleza
Campeonato Cearense: 2000, 2001, 2003, 2004, 2005, 2007, 2008

References

1975 births
Living people
Sportspeople from Ceará
Brazilian footballers
Association football midfielders
Campeonato Brasileiro Série B players
Campeonato Brasileiro Série A players
Fortaleza Esporte Clube players
América Futebol Clube (RN) players
FC Atlético Cearense players
Associação Atlética Aparecidense players